Myco may refer to:
 Myco (programming), a framework for developing software applications in the Perl programming language
Myco (singer) (born 1979), Japanese singer